The Swannanoa River flows through the Swannanoa Valley of the region of Western North Carolina, and is a major tributary to the French Broad River. Its headwaters arise in Black Mountain, NC; however, it also has a major tributary near its headwaters: Flat Creek, which begins on the slopes of Mount Mitchell. The Swannanoa River ends at its confluence with the French Broad, now within the grounds of the 8,000-acre Biltmore Estate in Asheville. 

The estate encompasses numerous ancient Native American sites, including an earthwork platform mound, now known as Biltmore Mound, that is located south of the Swannanoa River. Based on evidence from excavations conducted there in the early 21st century, the mound was started by indigenous people between 400 and 550CE, with the second to last stage of the mound built about 580-600CE. It was built over a Connestee Phase habitation (built during the Pisgah phase) in the Middle Woodland period. 

The historic Cherokee people occupied this area, which is part of their traditional homeland in this region. The mound has been identified as an area of feasting. The Cherokee called this site near the confluence Untokiasdiyi, meaning "where they race." They used it as a meeting place and area of competitive ritual games. 

Under pressure from European-American settlers, the Cherokee ceded their land here in 1819. This site near the Swannanoa River was later abandoned and became overgrown. At one time there was plowing in the area, reducing the height of the mound, but it is distinguished by a much wider, oval-shaped base. The mound was rediscovered in 1984. It was first excavated in a more than two-year project by a team from Appalachian State University, beginning in 2000.

The river is 22 miles or 35 kilometers long, and it flows entirely within the geographical boundaries of Buncombe County. It is a valuable resource to the county, providing drinking water to the Asheville metropolitan area, and numerous recreational opportunities. In September 2004, extremely heavy rains from the remnants of Hurricane Frances and Hurricane Ivan caused the Swannanoa to flood, causing major damage to the Biltmore Village section of Asheville, and to the other communities that it flows through.

Tributaries 
(Not necessarily in order.)
 Sweeten Creek
 Ross Creek
 Haw Creek
 Gashes Creek
 Grassy Branch
 Christian Creek
 Bull Creek
 Beetree Creek
 Lower North Fork
 Upper North Fork
 Tomahawk Branch
 Flat Creek
 Camp Branch

References

External links 
 RiverLink: Swannanoa River Watershed Project

Rivers of North Carolina
Bodies of water of Buncombe County, North Carolina